The 2015 West Tigers season was the sixteenth season in the club's history. Coached by Jason Taylor and captained by Robbie Farah, they completed the NRL's 2015 Telstra Premiership in second last position.

Squad movement

Gains

Losses

Re-signings

Ladder

Fixtures

NRL Auckland Nines

The NRL Auckland Nines is a pre-season rugby league nines competition featuring all 16 NRL clubs. The 2015 competition was played over two days on 31 January and 1 February at Eden Park. The Tigers feature in the Hunua Ranges pool and played the New Zealand Warriors, Gold Coast Titans, Canberra Raiders and Sydney Roosters

Regular season

Player statistics

Source =

References

Wests Tigers seasons
Wests Tigers season